Abu ʿUthmān al-Ḥakam ibn Abī al-ʿĀṣ ibn Umayya (died 655/56), was the father of the founder of the Marwanid line of the Umayyad dynasty, Marwan I, and a paternal uncle of Caliph Uthman. He was known as a staunch opponent of the Islamic prophet Muhammad and was consequently exiled when the latter captured their hometown of Mecca in 630. He was later pardoned by Uthman.

Family
Al-Hakam was the son of Abu al-As ibn Umayya of the Banu Abd Shams and Ruqayya bint al-Harith of the Banu Makhzum, both parents' clans belonging to the Quraysh tribe of Mecca. His paternal grandfather was the progenitor of the Umayyad family. 

Al-Hakam married Amina bint Alqama ibn Safwan al-Kinaniyya after she was divorced by his half-brother Affan ibn Abi al-As. She gave birth to al-Hakam's son, Marwan, who became the Umayyad caliph in 684-685 and the progenitor of all successive Umayyad caliphs. Al-Hakam fathered at least twenty, but probably over thirty children from four different wives and a number of slave women. Besides Marwan, Alqama was the mother of al-Hakam's eldest son, Uthman al-Azraq, and al-Harith, Abd al-Rahman, Salih and daughters Umm al-Banin and Zaynab. His second wife, Mulayka bint Awfa of the Banu Murra clan of the Ghatafan tribe, was the mother of his sons Yahya, Aban, Uthman al-Asghar, Habib, Amr and daughters Umm Yahya, Zaynab, Umm Shayba, Umm Uthman and Umm Salama. His third wife, Umm al-Nu'man bint al-Harith ibn Abi Amr of the Banu Thaqif tribe, gave him sons Nu'man, Aws, Suhayl, and Amr, and daughters Umm Aban, Umama, Umm Amr and Umm al-Hakam. His Qurayshite wife, al-Ba'itha bint Hashim ibn Utba ibn Rabi'a of the Banu Abd Shams was the mother of his son Yusuf.

Life
Al-Hakam was known to have staunchly opposed the Islamic prophet Muhammad and was thus exiled by the latter from Mecca to the nearby town of Taif. According to the history of 9th-century historian al-Tabari, Muhammad later pardoned al-Hakam and he was allowed to return to his hometown. However, in the history of 9th-century historian al-Yaqubi, al-Hakam was allowed to return to Mecca by his nephew, Caliph Uthman ibn Affan (r. 644–656), after his petitions to return were rejected by the previous two caliphs, Abu Bakr (r. 632–634) and Umar (r. 634–644). Uthman showed special favor to his kinsmen and he symbolically honored al-Hakam, along with his Umayyad relatives Abu Sufyan and al-Walid ibn Uqba and Banu Hashim member al-Abbas ibn Abd al-Muttalib, by allowing them to sit on his throne in Medina. Al-Hakam died in 655/56.

References

Bibliography

Year of birth missing
7th-century Arabs
656 deaths
Banu Umayya
Opponents of Muhammad